LeTourneau University (LETU) is a private, interdenominational evangelical Christian university in Longview, Texas. Founded as LeTourneau Technical Institute in February 1946 by R. G. LeTourneau with his wife, Evelyn, the school initially educated veterans returning from World War II. Total annual enrollment is nearly 3,000.

History 

R. G. LeTourneau founded LeTourneau Technical Institute in February 1946 on the site of the recently abandoned Harmon General Hospital, a World War II hospital that specialized in treating servicemen with neurological and dermatological issues. LeTourneau bought the site from the United States government with the help of Longview News-Journal publisher Carl Estes and other Longview community leaders for one dollar with the conditions that for the next decade, the U.S. government could reclaim the 156 acres (631,000 m2) and 220 buildings in the event of an emergency and no new construction or demolition could occur.

The State of Texas chartered the school on February 20, 1946, and classes were first held on April 1. At that point, enrollment at LeTourneau was exclusively male and predominantly veterans. For the first two years, LeTourneau provided an academy section to allow the completion of the junior and senior years of high school as well as a college section that offered two-year trade skill programs and a four-year technology program. Students attended classes on alternating days; while one half of the students were in class, the other half worked at R. G. LeTourneau's nearby LeTourneau Incorporated manufacturing plant (now part of Cameron International), thus satisfying the laboratory requirements of all of the industrial courses.

From 1946 to 1961, LeTourneau Technical Institute and LeTourneau, Inc. were one unified company under R. G. LeTourneau. In 1961, LeTourneau Technical Institute underwent a transformation into the co-educational LeTourneau College and began to offer bachelor's degrees in engineering, technology, and a limited number of arts and sciences. At this point, the college began to transition from the traditional wooden barracks buildings. The Tyler Hall Dormitory for men was erected in 1962, the Margaret Estes Library in 1963 and the Hollingsworth Science Hall in 1965.

The college continued to grow under the leadership of Allen C. Tyler in 1961 and 1962 and Richard H. LeTourneau (eldest son of R. G. and Evelyn) from 1962 to 1968. Harry T. Hardwick's presidency from 1968 to 1975 saw to the construction of the R. G. LeTourneau Memorial Student Center and the Longview Citizens Resource Center along with spearheading LeTourneau's accreditation by the Southern Association of Colleges and Schools. Richard LeTourneau again assumed the presidency from 1975 to 1985, during which time he oversaw the accreditation of the school's mechanical and electrical engineering programs by the Engineer's Council for Professional Development (now the Accreditation Board for Engineering and Technology) and supervised nine major construction projects.

LeTourneau College became LeTourneau University in 1989 under the leadership of President Alvin O. Austin, who served until 2007. Austin oversaw the development of an MBA program and the expansion of programs in business and education into educational centers in Houston, Dallas, Tyler, Austin and Bedford. Austin also oversaw the removal of all wooden barracks from the Longview campus except the historic landmark known as Speer Chapel, which is the only remaining WWII-era structure and is a popular place for weddings and ceremonies. Under Austin's leadership, the university's main campus underwent considerable improvements including the construction of the university mall and Belcher Bell Tower, the Solheim Recreation and Activity Center, the Glaske Engineering Center, seven new residence halls, and the S.E. Belcher Jr. Chapel and Performance Center, a 2,011-seat auditorium that opened in spring 2007.

In the spring of 2006, Austin announced that he would retire from his position as university president in June 2007 and assume the newly created role of university chancellor. On March 8, 2007, Dale A. Lunsford was announced as the new president of LeTourneau University. He assumed the office on July 1, 2007. Prior to accepting the job as university president, Lunsford served as the vice president of student affairs and external relations at the University of Texas at Tyler.

The school was in the spotlight in May 2015 when Outsports reported it "updated its student-athlete handbook to ban gay athletes from dating" and "athletes from showing support for gay marriage".

Academics
Most of the university's undergraduate degrees are focused on engineering, aeronautics, computer science, business, education. A smaller liberal arts program provides educational balance to the largely technical concentrations. The school also offers extensive business and management graduate classes in Houston, Dallas, and Longview.

Athletics
The LeTourneau YellowJackets compete in nine women's sports and eight men's sports in NCAA Division III athletics in the American Southwest Conference. These sports include men's and women's soccer, basketball, golf, tennis, cross country, indoor and outdoor track and field, men's baseball, women's softball, and women's volleyball. The school's mascot is "Brick" the yellow jacket and the colors are royal blue and gold. LeTourneau Athletic Director Terri Deike has overseen an improvement in LeTourneau Athletics in recent years, with multiple teams achieving playoff berths, many for the first time in over a decade. The Baseball team were the 2014 American Southwest Conference Champions. The Men's Basketball Team won more games than any ASC School from 2016 to 2020 averaging 22 wins a season, two ASC East Championships and the school's only NCAA Team Tournament win.  The Men's Basketball team won the 2020 American Southwest Conference Tournament.

LeTourneau also has a club Men's Rugby team which competes in the Lone Star conference of the Texas Rugby Union, a division of USA Rugby, alongside schools such as The University of Texas at San Antonio and Southern Methodist University.

The current head coach of the basketball team is James Wallace, who was also an assistant coach for the past 7 seasons.

Demographics

Traditional undergraduate enrollment and working adult enrollment look very different at LETU. Of traditional undergraduates enrolled at the Longview campus in the Fall of 2008, 72 percent are male and 28 percent are female, with an average age of 21. Three percent are international students; 52 percent come from other states. Homeschoolers account for nearly one in six students on LeTourneau's Longview campus. At LeTourneau's satellite campuses, which are exclusively used for nontraditional students, women outnumber men with 70 percent of the total enrollment.

Caucasians make up 65.4 percent of the student body. African-Americans are the largest minority group, with 21.6 percent. Eight percent are Hispanic, 13 percent are Asian, and less than half a percent are Native American.

Campus

Longview, the seat of Gregg County, is located about a two-hour drive east of Dallas and about a one-hour drive west from Shreveport, Louisiana. The main campus itself is located on the south side of Longview, two miles north of Interstate 20 (exit 595B). Most of LeTourneau University's 1,400 traditional students live on campus; the school requires all unmarried students under the age of 22 (who are not living with parents or relatives during the school year) to live in residence halls and on-campus apartments or to apply for a special waiver to live off-campus. While Longview is home to a variety of neighborhoods, both in age and economic circumstance, LeTourneau is located in the middle of the highest poverty (26.1% below poverty line based on 2000 census) and lowest income (median of $26,308 as of 2000 census) compared to 10 surrounding ZIP codes.

Student life

In addition to official university sports, intramural competitions in soccer, football, volleyball, ultimate and basketball are also highly valued and widely popular. Somewhat unusual to LeTourneau is the extensive amount of student pride and residence hall unity known as "floor pride". Many floors in the residence halls have their own student-created name, logo, mascot, colors, T-shirt, etc.; these floors form teams that compete in intramural events.

Floor system
LeTourneau has a housing system similar to the House System with the use of numerous (roughly 30) individual floor assignments as opposed to four houses (which is closer to the House System at Caltech). Housing is generally gender-segregated by building. In years where housing space is limited, one or two residence halls will have housing that is gender-segregated by floor. However, access is limited to each of these floors via Prox cards, which allow only residents into their respective floor areas. Freshmen are placed into floors based upon both building preference and the order in which applications and deposits are received. New students can request a particular floor through their application process, though some are placed at the discretion of Residence Life. Many students remain on the same floor until they graduate from the university, only leaving to move off campus or to on-campus apartments rather than to join another floor.

Greek life

LeTourneau has no traditional Greek system. There are three independent Greek Men's "Societies" and one independent Greek Women's "Society". Of those, the Societies Alpha Omega (ΑΩ), Kappa Zeta Chi (ΚΖΧ), and Lambda Alpha Sigma (ΛΑΣ) have charters from the university and have residence facilities on campus. The Greek Society Residences of ΑΩ, ΚΖΧ, and LAS are unique in that they are owned by the university but were built with donations from alumni and friends. The Greek Women's "Society" is Lambda Omega Chi (ΛΩΧ) and has a charter with the university but does not currently have a residential facility on campus. None of LeTourneau's Societies are part of national Greek organizations. Two previous societies, Tau Kappa Delta (ΤΚΔ) and Delta Sigma Psi (ΔΣΨ) lost their charters from the university in the 1990s.

Other student activities

LeTourneau has a variety of student-led foundations and a representative body of elected students known as the Student Senate (senate seats are allocated by residence hall or living area). A portion of each student's tuition and fees is allocated to Student Senate each year to distribute to spring break mission trips, campus activities, on-campus clubs, and other projects.

The Yellowjacket Activities Council (YAC), a university-sanctioned and funded student events committee, is responsible for planning and supervising several recreational "student life" activities each semester. Several student YAC Coordinators are responsible for different sections of planning and implementation of concerts, coffeehouse parties, midnight festivals, athletic competitions, off-campus events, movie nights, paintball, and Valentine parties. These are a few among the many activities organized by YAC.

Homecoming at LeTourneau, while once being hosted in the fall with a talent and variety show along with other activities for returning alumni, is now hosted in the spring. A Starlight Soiree is held, as well as athletic events, including the annual intersociety rope pull competition, and Hootenanny.

The traditional Hootenanny variety show brings together the majority of the student body, faculty, staff, alumni, and members of the community for a dose of original comedy, music, and talent. Most students at LETU attend the event. The event is put on by individuals or groups of students who have auditioned in the weeks leading up to the show. 2005 marked the 40th anniversary of the Hootenanny production. Traditionally, members of the school faculty and administration have also participated at the students' request, often in satirical roles. "Hootenuity 2007" marked the end of using the Belcher Gym as the performance venue, with the new S. E. Belcher Chapel and Performance center slated as the new home for "O Hootenanny, Where Art Thou?" in the 2007–2008 school year. Because of this transition, the well-used rotating stage was destroyed and a two-story stage built to make use of the new facility. The rotating stage was a product of a senior design project in the 1970s.

Partners 
The school is interdenominational and thus has various evangelical partner denominations.

Notable alumni
Patricia Harless (Class of 1995) - Republican member of the Texas House of Representatives from District 126 in Harris County from 2007 to 2017.

See also
R. G. LeTourneau
Longview, Texas

References

External links

Official website
Official athletics website

 
Private universities and colleges in Texas
Educational institutions established in 1946
Universities and colleges accredited by the Southern Association of Colleges and Schools
Education in Gregg County, Texas
Evangelicalism in Texas
1946 establishments in Texas
Council for Christian Colleges and Universities
Engineering universities and colleges in Texas